Ermolao or Hermolao Barbaro, also Hermolaus Barbarus (21 May 145414 June 1493), was an Italian Renaissance scholar.

Education
Ermolao Barbaro was born in Venice, the son of Zaccaria Barbaro, and the grandson of Francesco Barbaro. He was also the uncle of Daniele Barbaro and Marcantonio Barbaro

Much of his early education was outside of Venice, accompanying his father who was an active politician and diplomat. He received further education in Verona with an uncle, also named Ermolao. In 1462 he was sent to Rome, where he studied under Pomponius Laetus and Theodorus Gaza.  By 1468 he had returned to Verona, where Frederick III awarded him a laurel crown for his poetry.

He completed his education at the University of Padua, where he was appointed professor of philosophy there in 1477. Two years later he revisited Venice, but returned to Padua when the plague broke out in his native city.

Career
Barbaro had an active political career, though he resented these duties as a distraction from his studies.  In 1483 he was elected to the Senate of the Republic of Venice.  He was twenty when he gave the funeral oration for Doge Nicholas Marcello in 1474.

In 1486, he was sent to the court of the Duchy of Burgundy in Bruges.  In 1488 he held the important civil post of Savio di Terrafirma.  In 1489 he was appointed ambassador to the Duchy of Milan and in 1490 he was appointed Ambassador to the Holy See.  In 1491, Pope Innocent VIII, nominated him to the office of Patriarch of Aquileia. 
 

It was illegal under Venetian law for ambassadors to accept gifts or positions of foreign heads of state.  There was also a dispute between Venice and the Papacy as to who should nominate Patriarchs of Aquileia. Barbaro was accused of treason and the Venetian Senate ordered him to refuse the position. Pope Innocent and his successor Alexander VI threatened to excommunicate Barbaro if he resigned as Patriarch of Aquileia.

The Venetian Senate revoked Barbaro's appointment as ambassador and exiled him from Venice. They threatened the same for his father, Zaccaria, as well as confiscation of both men's property, but Zaccaria died shortly afterwards.

Barbaro then lived in a Roman villa on the Pincian Hill belonging to his brothers Daniele and Ludovico.  He died there of the plague in 1493 and was buried at the church of Santa Maria del Popolo. Ferdinando Ughelli mentions an inscription to Barbaro there, but it was lost by 1758.  Valeriano wrote a tribute to Barbaro.

Scholarly works
Barbaro edited and translated a number of classical works: Aristotle's Ethics and Politics (1474); Aristotle's Rhetorica (1479);Themistius's Paraphrases of certain works of Aristotle (1481);Castigationes in Pomponium Melam (1493).

His own work, De Coelibatu was less influential, but Barbaro's Castigationes Plinianae, published in Rome in 1492 by Eucharius Silber, was perhaps his most influential work. In this discussion of Pliny's Natural History Barbaro made 5000 corrections to the text. The work was written in only twenty months and dedicated to the newly elected Pope Alexander VI. Castigationes Plinianae was considered by Barbaro's contemporaries to be the most authoritative work on Pliny.  Even before his death, he was considered a leading authority on the Greek and Latin works of antiquity. Erasmus frequently cited Barbaro's works, often with respect.

His letters to Giovanni Pico were also widely circulated. Much of his work was published after his death: In Dioscuridem Corollarii libri quinque, a work on Dioscorides, in 1516, his translations of Aristotle in 1544, and Compendium Scientiae Naturalis in 1545.

Barbaro's work De Officio Legati was representative of a revolution in the conduct of diplomacy which took place during the Renaissance.

Publications

Notes

References

1454 births
1490s deaths
15th-century Venetian writers
Italian classical scholars
Italian translators
Patriarchs of Aquileia
Republic of Venice politicians
Ambassadors of the Republic of Venice to the Duchy of Milan
Ambassadors of the Republic of Venice to the Holy See
15th-century Italian Roman Catholic bishops
University of Padua alumni
Academic staff of the University of Padua
Ermolao, Scholar
15th-century Italian diplomats